Hitmaker is a 2016 South Korean variety show starring Kangin, Jung Joon-young, Jung Jin-woon and Lee Chul-woo. It airs on JTBC on Fridays at 23:20 (KST).

Cast members
 Kangin
 Jung Joon-young
 Jung Jin-woon
 Lee Chul-woo

References

External links
 

2016 South Korean television series debuts
Korean-language television shows
JTBC original programming
South Korean travel television series
South Korean sports television series
South Korean variety television shows